A Bird Flew In is an upcoming British drama film written by Dominic Wells & Elizabeth Morris and directed by Kirsty Bell in her directorial debut. The film stars Derek Jacobi, Jeff Fahey and Sadie Frost.

Cast
 Derek Jacobi
 Jeff Fahey
 Julie Dray
 Sophie Kennedy Clark
 Sadie Frost
 Morgana Robinson
 Camilla Rutherford
 Michael Winder
 Frances Barber
 Daniel Ward

Production
The film was shot in London, England and Marseille, France

References

External links
 

Upcoming films
British drama films